Joan Champernowne, Lady Denny (died 1553) was a lady-in-waiting at the court of King Henry VIII of England. She became a close friend to his sixth wife, Queen Catherine Parr. 

She married Sir Anthony Denny, who at the end of King Henry's reign was widely considered to be his most trusted servant.

Biography 
Joan was born in Modbury, Devon on an unknown date, but no later than 1513, the daughter of Sir Philip Champernowne and his wife, K(C)atherine Carew. She married Sir Anthony Denny, son of Sir Edmund Denny.

In August 1539, she and others ladies of the court visited Portsmouth to see a newly built ship. They sent Henry VIII a joint letter which was signed by Mabel, Lady Southampton, Margaret Tallebois, Margaret Howard (sister of Queen Catherine Howard), Alice Browne, Anne Knyvett (daughter of Thomas Knyvett), "Jane Denny", Jane Meutas, Anne Bassett, Elizabeth Tyrwhitt, and Elizabeth Harvey.

She had twelve children, including:
 Henry Denny, Dean of Chester (d. 24 March 1574). He married, firstly, Honory Grey, daughter of William Grey, 13th Baron Grey de Wilton and Lady Mary Somerset. His second wife was Elizabeth Grey, by whom he had a son, who died unmarried.
 Sir Edward Denny (died 12 February 1600), married Margaret Edgcumbe, daughter of Sir Piers Edgcumbe (1536 - c.1607), by whom he had issue.

Joan was considered to be both beautiful and intelligent, and a member of the burgeoning Protestant faction at court along with her husband. She was the niece of Katherine Ashley née Champernowne, the governess of Queen Elizabeth I. The Tudor historian, Joanna Denny, was a descendant of Joan's.

References

Sources
Narasingha P. Sil. Oxford Dictionary of National Biography, Denny, Sir Anthony (1501–1549) 

1553 deaths
16th-century  English women
English ladies-in-waiting
Wives of knights
Year of birth unknown
Denny family
Court of Henry VIII